Tetracha orbignyi is a species of tiger beetle that was described by Naviaux in 2007, and is endemic to Paraguay.

References

Cicindelidae
Beetles described in 2007
Endemic fauna of Paraguay
Beetles of South America